Boris Godunov is a 1986 drama film directed by and starring Sergei Bondarchuk. It is an adaptation of the 1825 play Boris Godunov, written by Alexander Pushkin. The picture was co-produced by the Soviet Union, Poland, Czechoslovakia, and West Germany. It was entered into the 1986 Cannes Film Festival.

Plot
The action takes place in Russia and Poland as the 16th century ends and the 17th century begins. The reign of Boris Godunov is depicted, his son Feodor, and the coming to power of False Dmitry I. After the death of the feeble-minded Tsar Fedor Ivanovich, son of Ivan the Terrible, Boris Godunov takes the throne, by the decision of the Zemsky Sobor, with the help of intrigues, alliances and the arrangement of his sister Irina's marriage to Tsarevich Feodor, gains great influence and power in the court.

But suddenly there is a new contender for the throne – a man posing as Dmitri, the younger son of Ivan the Terrible,  who officially died in Uglich in 1591. The pretender shows up in Poland and after he receives the support of Prince Vishnevetzky, Sandomierz voivode Mniszech and his daughter, the beautiful Marina, returns to Russia. Despite the fact that the church and Vasily Shuiski, who investigated the circumstances of the death of Dmitry, deny the authenticity of the prince, he on his way to Moscow. He is becoming increasingly popular among the people and is setting up to be a real threat to Tsar Boris. Who is he really – a daring adventurer, a true prince, or a ghost who has materialized to avenge a long-forgotten crime?

Cast
 Sergei Bondarchuk as Boris Godunov
 Alyona Bondarchuk as tsarevna Xenia Godunova
 Gennady Mitrofanov as fool for Christ
 Roman Filippov as Patriarch Job of Moscow
 Valery Storozhik as prince Dmitry Kurbsky
 Yuri Lazarev as Gavrila Pushkin
 Vladimir Sedov as Afanasy Pushkin
 Georgi Burkov as Barlaam
 Vadim Aleksandrov as Misael
 Irina Skobtseva as tavern hostess
 Kira Golovko as nurse of Xenia
 Lyudmila Korshakova as tsaritsa Maria Skuratova-Belskaya
 Fyodor Bondarchuk as tsarevitch Theodore Godunov
 Henryk Machalica as Jerzy Mniszech
 Olgierd Łukaszewicz as Mikołaj Czernikowski
 Marian Dziędziel as Adam Wiśniowiecki
 Vladimir Novikov as Semyon Godunov
 Valeriy Sheptekita as Father Superior of Chudov Monastery

References

External links

1986 films
1980s historical drama films
1980s French-language films
Soviet historical drama films
Russian historical drama films
Polish historical films
Czech historical drama films
West German films
1980s Russian-language films
Films directed by Sergei Bondarchuk
Films based on works by Aleksandr Pushkin
Films shot in the Czech Republic
Films set in the 1590s
Films set in the 1600s
Cultural depictions of Boris Godunov
Mosfilm films
1986 multilingual films
Soviet multilingual films
Russian multilingual films
Polish multilingual films
Czech multilingual films
German multilingual films
Russian-language Czech films
French-language Czech films